The Thalhimer Tennis Center is the intercollegiate tennis facility at Virginia Commonwealth University in Richmond, Virginia. It is home stadium and training facility for the VCU Rams women's tennis and the VCU Rams men's tennis teams.

Facility 

The facility is part of the VCU Athletic Village which contains the Cary Street Gym, the Cary Street Field and Sports Backers Stadium. Apart from Sports Backers, these three athletic facilities are all within a block of one another. The Thalhimer Center opened in 1993 with six tennis courts, and has bleachers to sit up to 200 people.

References

External links 
 VCU Athletics Page on Thalhimer Center

VCU Rams tennis
Tennis venues in Virginia
1993 establishments in Virginia
Sports venues completed in 1993